Coulterville (formerly Maxwell's Creek) is a census-designated place in Mariposa County, California, United States. Coulterville had a population of 115 at the 2020 census, down from 201 at the 2010 census, when the CDP covered a much greater area. It is a mining town located in the foothills of the Sierra Nevada. The ZIP Code is 95311. The community is inside area code 209.

History

The place was settled in 1850 by George W. Coulter, for whom it is also named. For a time Coulter lived in a tent flying the American flag, prompting local Mexicans to call the place Banderita (Spanish for "small flag"). The Maxwell's Creek post office opened in 1852 and changed its name to Coulterville in 1853. The name "Maxwell" honors George Maxwell, with whom Coulter cast lots to determine the name of the town.

Coulterville is registered as California Historical Landmark #332. A large portion of the downtown was listed on the National Register of Historic Places as the Coulterville Main Street Historic District.

The 1867 Brevet General James F. Rusling inspection report notes that most of the Stockton to Coulterville area was "in almost continuous wheat-fields" May 24–26, 1866.

Geography

Demographics

The 2010 United States Census reported that Coultervillle had a population of 201. The racial makeup of Coultervillle was 181 (90.0%) White, 0 (0.0%) African American, 5 (2.5%) Native American, 1 (0.5%) Asian, 0 (0.0%) Pacific Islander, 0 (0.0%) from other races, and 14 (7.0%) from two or more races. Hispanic or Latino of any race were 20 persons (10.0%).

The Census reported that 201 people (100% of the population) lived in households, 0 (0%) lived in non-institutionalized group quarters, and 0 (0%) were institutionalized.

There were 95 households, out of which 19 (20.0%) had children under the age of 18 living in them, 34 (35.8%) were opposite-sex married couples living together, 9 (9.5%) had a female householder with no husband present, 11 (11.6%) had a male householder with no wife present.  There were 8 (8.4%) unmarried opposite-sex partnerships, and 1 (1.1%) same-sex married couples or partnerships. 32 households (33.7%) were made up of individuals, and 11 (11.6%) had someone living alone who was 65 years of age or older. The average household size was 2.12.  There were 54 families (56.8% of all households); the average family size was 2.61.

The population was spread out, with 30 people (14.9%) under the age of 18, 15 people (7.5%) aged 18 to 24, 35 people (17.4%) aged 25 to 44, 77 people (38.3%) aged 45 to 64, and 44 people (21.9%) who were 65 years of age or older.  The median age was 52.9 years. For every 100 females there were 116.1 males.  For every 100 females age 18 and over, there were 113.8 males.

The homeowner vacancy rate was 5.6%; the rental vacancy rate was 11.4%.  134 people (66.7% of the population) lived in owner-occupied housing units and 67 people (33.3%) lived in rental housing units.

Government

Coulterville, along with its neighboring communities of Greeley Hill and Lake Don Pedro (Mariposa Cnty. portion) comprise County Supervisorial District 3 of the county of Mariposa.

References

External links
 https://web.archive.org/web/20071223151304/http://www.goldrushcam.com/coulterville_greeley_%20hill.htm
 http://www.coultervillemuseum.org

Census-designated places in Mariposa County, California
California Historical Landmarks